Univer-Export or Univerexport, a Serbian supermarket chain with headquarters in Novi Sad, Serbia. As of 2016, it has 3.20% market share in Serbia. As of 2018, its retail chain contains a total of over 180 stores. Main fields of business of Univerexport company are wholesale, supermarkets, and minimarkets. Univerexport retail chain is mainly located in northern Serbia, province of Vojvodina. Univerexport was founded on 25 September 1990. In 1991, the development of giant began with the opening of the warehouse in Bajci Zilinskog Street in Novi Sad, then starting the wholesale and opening the first retail store.

See also
 List of supermarket chains in Serbia

References

External links
 

Companies based in Novi Sad
Retail companies established in 1990
D.o.o. companies in Serbia
Retail companies of Serbia
Supermarkets of Serbia
Serbian brands
Serbian companies established in 1990